The thicktail day gecko (Phelsuma mutabilis) is a species of gecko found in Madagascar.

References

Phelsuma
Reptiles described in 1869